The 51st Engineer Battalion "Simeto" is an inactive military engineer unit of the Italian Army last based in Palermo in Sicily. An engineer battalion with the number LI served during the later half of World War I. In 1935 an engineer battalion was formed for the Second Italo-Ethiopian War, which received the same number. The battalion remained active after the war and served in the Western Desert Campaign and Tunisian Campaign during World War II. In 1943 the Italian Co-belligerent Army formed an engineer battalion with the number LI. This battalion was initially assigned to the I Motorized Grouping, then the Italian Liberation Corps, and finally the Combat Group "Legnano". The battalion participated in the entire Italian Campaign on the allied side.

After the war the battalion was assigned to the Infantry Division "Legnano". In 1946 the battalion split into the Engineer Battalion "Legnano" and the Signal Battalion "Legnano". In 1975 the battalion was disbanded. In 1983 the battalion was reformed in Sicily and named for the Simeto river. In 1995 the battalion was disbanded and its personnel and materiel used to reform the 4th Engineer Regiment.

History

World War I 
On 22 May 1916 the regimental depot of the 2nd Engineer Regiment in Casale Monferrato formed the LI Sappers Battalion. The battalion consisted of a command, and the 104th, 134th, and 156th sappers companies. The battalion served on the Asiago Plateau until it was disbanded on 1 March 1918.

World War II 

On 15 July 1935 the regimental depot of the 4th Engineer Regiment in Trento formed the LI Mixed Engineer Battalion for the 32nd Motorized Division "Trento", which deployed to Libya from December 1935 to August 1936 during the Second Italo-Ethiopian War. The Trento served in the Western Desert Campaign, until it was destroyed in the Second Battle of El Alamein. The LI Mixed Engineer Battalion suffered heavy losses in the battle and was later filled up with the survivors of other destroyed engineer units. During the Tunisian Campaign the battalion was attached first to the 27th Infantry Division "Brescia" and then the 16th Infantry Division "Pistoia". The battalion surrendered to the allies on 13 May 1943.

On 13 November 1943 the LI Mixed Engineer Battalion was reformed in Colli a Volturno by the Italian Co-belligerent Army. The battalion consisted of a command, the 51st Teleradio Company, and the 51st Engineer Company, which had been formed on 27 September 1943 in San Pietro Vernotico. The battalion was assigned to the I Motorized Grouping and from 22 March 1944 to the Italian Liberation Corps, which was reorganized as Combat Group "Legnano" on 30 September 1944. After joining the combat group the battalion was augmented with the 3rd Engineer Company. For its service during the Italian Campaign the battalion was awarded a Silver Medal of Military Valour.

Cold War 

After World War II the battalion was based in Bergamo and remained assigned to the Legano, which was expanded to Infantry Division "Legnano". The battalion consisted of a command, the 3rd and 51st engineer companies, the 51st Teleradio Company, and the 3rd Field Park Company. On 1 December 1946 the battalion was split to form the Engineer Battalion "Legnano" in Pavia and the Signal Battalion "Legnano" in Bergamo. With the split the battalion added a command platoon.

On 8 April the companies were renumbered as 1st and 2nd engineer companies, and 3rd Field Park Company. On 1 October 1956 it raised the 3rd Engineer Company and in August 1966 the 4th Engineer Company. In 1968 the battalion moved to Verona. On 1 October 1975 the Infantry Division "Legnano" was split to form the Mechanized Brigade "Legnano" and Mechanized Brigade "Brescia". On the same date the Engineer Battalion "Legnano" was disbanded and its personnel and materiel used to form the Engineer Company "Legnano" and Engineer Company "Brescia".

On 1 January 1983 the 51st Engineer Battalion "Simeto" was formed in Palermo. Since the 1975 army reform engineer battalions were named for a lake if they supported a corps or named for a river if they supported a division or brigade. As the 51st Engineer Battalion "Simeto" supported the division-level Military Region Sicily the battalion was named for the Simeto river in Sicily. When the battalion was granted its flag, it also received the traditions of all preceding engineer units numbered 51, as well as the traditions of the 12th Engineer Regiment, which had been based in Palermo from 1 October 1922 to July 1943, and whose motto the battalion inherited. The battalion consisted of a command, a command and services company, the 1st Engineer Company, and the Engineer Park Company. On 11 December 1985 the battalion added the 2nd Engineer Company.

On 19 September 1995 the 51st Engineer Battalion "Simeto" was disbanded and the next day the 4th Engineer Regiment was reformed with the personnel and materiel of the disbanded battalion. As the flag of the 4th Engineer Regiment was still assigned to the 4th Engineer Battalion "Orta" the regiment continued to use the flag of the Simeto. The Orta was disbanded on 13 October 1995 and the flag of the 4th Engineer Regiment arrived in Palermo on 24 October 1995. The flag of the 51st Engineer Battalion "Simeto" was then transferred to the Shrine of the Flags in the Vittoriano in Rome.

External links
Italian Army Website: LI Battaglione misto Genio

References

Engineer Regiments of Italy